Dieticyclidine (PCDE), or diethylphenylcyclohexylamine, is a psychoactive drug and research chemical of the arylcyclohexylamine chemical class related to phencyclidine (PCP) and eticyclidine (PCE). It acts as an NMDA receptor antagonist but has low potency and acts mainly as a prodrug for eticyclidine.

References 

Arylcyclohexylamines
Diethylamino compounds
Designer drugs
Dissociative drugs
NMDA receptor antagonists